La Esquina del Infinito is a 2000 album released by the band La Renga. It achieved platinum status in Argentina for sales in excess of 60,000 copies.

Track listing
All songs by Gustavo Nápoli except "Hey, Hey, My, My" (Neil Young) and "En Pie" (Manuel Varela)
 "La Vida, Las Mismas Calles" [The life, the same streets]
 "Motoralmaisangre"
 "Al Que He Sangrado" [To which I have bled]
 "Panic Show"
 "El Cielo del Desengaño" [The sky of disappointment]
 "Arte Infernal" [Infernal art]
 "En El Baldío" [In the wasteland]
 "En Pie" [Standing]
 "El Rey de La Triste Felicidad" [The king of sad happiness]
 "Estalla" [Explodes]
 "Hey, Hey, My, My"

Personnel
Chizzo – lead vocals, lead guitar
Tete – bass guitar
Tanque – drums
Chiflo – saxophone, trumpet
Manu – saxophone, harmonica, rhythm guitar

Guest musicians
Dimitri Rodnoy – cello (track 5)
Carlos Patan – piano (track 6)
Ricardo Mollo – guitar, arrangements (track 8)

Additional personnel
Gustavo Borner – recording technician, mixing, mastering
Gabriel Goncalvez – manager
Alejandro Vasquez – A&R
Laura Varsky – artwork

References

2000 albums
La Renga albums